The Noul Săsesc gas field is a natural gas field located in Laslea, Sibiu County. It was discovered in 1920 and developed by and Romgaz. It began production in 1925 and produces natural gas and condensates. The total proven reserves of the Noul Săsesc gas field are around 3.55 trillion cubic feet (100 km³), and production is slated to be around 70 million cubic feet/day (2×105m³) in 2010.

References

Natural gas fields in Romania